The 2019 Men's under-19 World Floorball Championships B-Division took place in conjunction with the tenth world championships in men's under-19 floorball. The tournament took place from May 8–12, 2019 in Halifax, Canada, and was the first Men's U-19 WFC played outside of Europe.

Qualification 
26 teams registered for the tenth men's under-19 world championships.. The top eight teams from the 2017 U-19 WFC automatically qualified as part of the A-Division.  Poland was relegated from the A-Division, Canada qualified automatically as the host, and the United States thus qualified automatically with the spot from the Americas, with the remainder of the teams competing to qualify for the five remaining spots in the B-Division.

In Europe, there were two qualification event locations - Moscow (Russia) and Bolzano (Italy). The Asia-Oceania group tournament took place in Wellington, New Zealand.

Venues

Tournament groups

Championship results 
All times are local (UTC -3)

Preliminary round

Group C

Group D

Placement round

15th place match

13th place match

Playoff round

Semifinals

Bronze Medal match

Final

Final standings 

Germany qualified for the A and B groups at the 2021 Men's U-19 World Floorball Championship.

See also 
 2019 Men's under-19 World Floorball Championships

References

External links
 Official Website

Floorball World Championships
2019 in floorball
International floorball competitions hosted by Canada